The fortress known as Veste Spantekow is the oldest and most important Renaissance castle in North Germany and is situated in the village of Spantekow, southwest of Anklam in the German federated state of Mecklenburg-Western Pomerania. It covers an area of c. 4 hectares.

References

Literature 
 Lutz Mohr: Klosterruine Stolpe und Burg Spantekow im Umfeld von Anklam. Zwei markante geschichtsträchtige Stätten aus dem mittelalterlichen Pommern. In: Stier und Greif. Blätter zur Kultur- und Landesgeschichte in Mecklenburg-Vorpommern, Jg. 17, Schwerin, 2007, pp. 46−65.

External links 

Homepage of Spantekow Castle by owner Friedrich Freiherr von Harnier
Nutzungskonzept Wellness facility of the castle and surroundings (Krause Bohne Architects, Aachen)
Lutz Mohr, Spantekow Castle

Castles in Mecklenburg-Western Pomerania
House of Schwerin
Anklam